Cyril Glyndwr Williams (1 June 1921 – 31 May 2004) was a Welsh religious scholar, Congregationalist minister and academic. He was professor of religions at Carleton University from 1968 to 1973 and president of the British Association for the Study of Religions from 1985 to 1988. He was a graduate of the University of Wales and had lectured on the history of religion at University College Cardiff from 1958 to 1969. After his time at Carleton University, he was successively senior lecturer (1973–75) and reader in religious studies at the University College of Wales at Aberystwyth. He was later given a personal chair there. In 1983, his department merged into the Department of Theology and Religious Studies at Saint David's University College, Lampeter.

References

Further reading 
 D. Densil Morgan, "Williams, Cyril Glyndwr", Dictionary of Welsh Biography (The National Library of Wales, 2021).

1921 births
2004 deaths
Religious studies scholars
Alumni of the University of Wales
Academics of Cardiff University
Academic staff of Carleton University
Academics of Aberystwyth University
Academics of the University of Wales, Lampeter